Seticosta szeptyckii is a species of moth of the family Tortricidae. It is found in Ecuador in Cotopaxi and Napo provinces.

The wingspan is 24 mm for males and 27 mm for females. The forewings are brown with orange rust and dark brown suffusions. The hindwings are creamish with brownish-grey strigulation (fine streaks).

Etymology
The species is named in honour of Professor Dr. Andrzej Szeptycki, a specialist of Protura, Apterytota.

References

Moths described in 2009
Seticosta